Joseph-Henri Deverin (1846-1921)
was a French architect and urban planner.  He was the chief architect of historic monuments.

Life

Joseph-Henri Deverin was born in 1846.  In 1865 he was admitted to the École des Beaux-Arts. 
He studied under Daumet and de Lisch.
He built some townhouses in Paris. 
The townhouse at 68 rue Ampère, which he designed and the engineer Weyher built around 1880, has been registered as a historic monument.
It has a neo-Gothic facade and interior, and is one of the last of the tall buildings in the rue Ampère from the 19th century.

In 1877 Deverin joined the Department of Historic Monuments, and in 1897 became a departmental chief architect.  
He worked in the departments of Vienne, Deux-Sèvres and Vendée (1897-1917) and in Loire-Atlantique (1898). 
His main works were Porte Saint-Jacques, Parthenay and the churches of Saint-Jouin-de-Marnes, Airvault and Oiron in Deux-Sèvres. 
He also restored several buildings in Vienne and Loire-Inférieure after the Department of Historic Monuments was reorganized in 1897.

Deverin retired in 1919 and died in 1921.

Proposals

The Palais-Royal ward had become stagnant after the depression of the 1880s, visited by few tourists.
In 1900 a major fire destroyed the Comédie-Française. The Palais-Royal was destroyed and then restored for the twentieth time.
To bring the ward back to life, Deverin proposed to extend the Rue Vivienne through the palace to intersect the Rue de Rivoli in front of the Conseil d'Etat.

Deverin also wanted to change the buildings and build extensions incorporating the style of Napoleon III's Louvre expansion. This project, which would have harmonized the architecture of the Palais-Royal with that of Hector Lefuel in the Louvre, was ultimately not carried out.

Henri Deverin also proposed to implement a statue representing the city of Paris behind the apse of Notre Dame de Paris. 
This project was also rejected.

Gallery

Bibliography

References
Notes

Citations

Sources

1846 births
1921 deaths
19th-century French architects
French urban planners
20th-century French architects